Uche Agbo  (born 4 April 1975) is a retired Nigerian professional football midfielder. He played for several clubs in Europe.

Career
Agbo played for the Belgrade clubs FK Rad and FK Obilić in FR Yugoslavia before moving to clubs in France and Turkey. He scored one goal for Obilić in the First League of FR Yugoslavia, on November 26, 1995, in a away defeat against FK Sloboda Užice by 1–2. He played for Montpellier HSC in the French Ligue 1 during the 1997-98 season and Adanaspor in the Turkish Süper Lig during the 1998-99 season.

His name is occasionally spelled in sources as Uceh Agbo or Uceh Agboh.

References

1975 births
Living people
People from Aba, Abia
Nigerian footballers
Nigerian expatriate footballers
Association football midfielders
FK Rad players
FK Obilić players
Expatriate footballers in Serbia and Montenegro
Montpellier HSC players
Ligue 1 players
Expatriate footballers in France
Adanaspor footballers
Süper Lig players
Expatriate footballers in Turkey
Nigerian expatriate sportspeople in Turkey
Nigerian expatriate sportspeople in Serbia and Montenegro